Elbakin.net is a French website created in 2000, dealing with fantasy in all media (books, illustrations, comic books, films, TV fictions, games). It is one of the main Francophone information websites dedicated to the fantasy genre. Since 2006, the main contributors to the website formed an eponymous association (under France's 1901 law on associations) which manages the website and undertakes cultural actions in the same field.

History 
In early September 2000, three fantasy lovers, namely Raphaël Cervera, Jean-François le Gac and Emmanuel Chastellière, launched a website, Elbakin.com, resulting from the merger of their individual websites. At that time, Elbakin.net was mainly dedicated to the universe of The Lord of the Rings and its film adaptation by Peter Jackson, then in production, and the website made itself known by relaying information about the film adaptation. After the release of the trilogy, the website was dedicated to all aspects of fantasy.

In April 2001, a new version of the website was published online. In April 2002, Elbakin.net renewed its forum by setting up a phpBB engine to deal with the increase in Internet traffic.

In September 2003, the website replaced its domain name and became Elbakin.net. In 2004, the permanent editorial board of the website changed: Emmanuel Chastellière was the only remaining active founding member, and several new editors joined the team.

In 2006, Elbakin.net became a voluntary association under France's 1901 law. Its aim is to promote the fantasy genre, mainly with the website Elbakin.net but also by other means, especially participation in festivals.

In February 2009, the website opened a Facebook page.

In June 2009, Elbakin.net took part in two study days organised by the Paris 13 University about fantasy in France with the participation of an editor of the website in a round table.

In 2010, Elbakin.net organised France's first Fantasy convention in Grenoble from 26 to 29 August, alongside the 37th  Science Fiction convention. On that occasion a fantasy literary award was introduced: the Elbakin.net Award.

In September 2010, the website celebrated the tenth anniversary of its founding, and on this special occasion published words of encouragement from several well-known figures in French fantasy, including the authors Alain Damasio, Pierre Pevel, Jean-Philippe Jaworski and Fabrice Colin, and academics like Vincent Ferré.

At Christmas 2010, the website launched a podcast as a series of monthly programmes featuring a review of the past year and reviews of books and films. The first series included eight programmes published online between Christmas 2010 and July 2011, and continued over the following months.

Elbakin.net Award

French novel

2017 
 Winner: Lionel Davoust : La Messagère du Ciel
 Shortlisted:
 Pierre Bordage : La Désolation (série Arkane)
 Jean-Laurent Del Soccoro : Boudicca
 Estelle Faye : Les Seigneurs de Bohen
 Victor Fleury : L'Empire électrique

2016 
 Winner: Fabien Clavel : Feuillets de cuivre
 Shortlisted:
 Stefan Platteau : Dévoreur
 Anthelme Hauchecorne : Le Carnaval aux corbeaux
 Christian Chavassieux : Les Nefs de Pangée
 Lionel Davoust : Port d' mes

2015 
 Winner: Jean-Laurent Del Socorro : Royaume de vent et de colères
 Shortlisted:
 Gabriel Katz  : Aeternia, la marche du prophète (série Aeternia)
 Martin Page : Je suis un dragon
 Lionel Davoust : La Route de la conquête
 Nicolas Le Breton : Les  mes envolées

2014 
 Winner: Karim Berrouka : Fées, Weed et Guillotines
 Shortlisted:
 Fabien Cerutti : Le Bâtard de Kosigan
 Stefan Platteau : Manesh (série Les Sentiers des astres)
 Jean-Philippe Jaworski : Même pas mort (série Rois du monde)
 Adrien Tomas : Notre-Dame des loups

2013 
 Winner: Estelle Faye : Porcelaine
 Shortlisted:
 Jean-Philippe Depotte : Le Chemin des Dieux
 Pierre Pevel : Le Chevalier (série Haut-Royaume)
 Régis Goddyn : Le Sang des 7 rois (série Le Sang des 7 rois)
 Olivier Peru : Martyrs (Série Martyrs)

2012 
 Winner: Justine Niogret : Mordre le bouclier (série Chien du heaume)
 Shortlisted:
 David Calvo : Elliot du Néant
 Cédric Ferrand : Wastburg
 Laurent Kloetzer : Petites Morts
 Michel Pagel : Le Dernier des Francs

2011 
 Winner: Thierry Di Rollo : Bankgreen (série Bankgreen)
 Shortlisted:
 Raphaël Albert : Avant le déluge (série Les Extraordinaires et Fantastiques Enquêtes de Sylvio Sylvain, détective privé)
 Fabien Clavel : Le Châtiment des flèches
 Fabrice Colin & Michael Moorcock : Les Buveurs d'âme (Série Elric)
 Laurent Kloetzer : Cleer, une fantaisie corporate

2010 
 Winner: Charlotte Bousquet : Cytheriae (série L'Archipel des numinées)
 Shortlisted:
 Ugo Bellagamba : Tancrède, une uchronie
 Lionel Davoust : La Volonté du dragon
 Christophe Lambert : Vegas mytho
 Justine Niogret : Chien du heaume (série Chien du heaume)

French novel for young people

2017 
 Winner: Delphine Laurent : Le lien du faucon
 Shortlisted:
 Marine Carteron : Génération K
 Marie-Lorna Vaconsin : La fille aux cheveux rouges
 Ruberto Sanquer : L'aura noire
 Charlotte Bousquet : Sang-de-lune

2016 
 Winner: Aurélie Wellenstein : Les Loups chantants
 Shortlisted:
 Marie Vareille : Elia, la passeuse d'âmes
 Amandine Labarre et Nicolas Labarre : L'Autre Herbier
 Lucie Pierrat-Pajot : Les Mystères de Larispem
 Paul Beorn : Un ogre en cavale

2015 
 Winner: Estelle Faye : Thya (série La Voie des oracles)
 Shortlisted:
 Timothée de Fombelle : Le Livre de perle
 Aurélie Wellenstein : Le Roi des fauves
 Cassandra O'Donnell : La Vallée magique (série Malenfer)
 B.F. Parry : Oniria - Le Royaume des rêves

2014 
 Winner: Christelle Dabos : Les Fiancés de l’hiver
 Shortlisted:
 Victor Dixen : Animale
 François Place : Angel, l’indien blanc
 Joann Sfar : GrandClapier
 Cindy Van Wilder : Les Outrepasseurs

2013 
 Winner: Marie Pavlenko : La Fille-sortilège
 Shortlisted:
 Pauline Bock : Les Lumières de Haven
 Hervé Jubert : Magies secrètes
 Carole Trébor : Nina Volkovitch
 Fabrice Colin : 49 jours (série La Dernière Guerre)

2012 
 Winner: Jean-Luc Marcastel : L'Enfant-monstre (série La Geste d'Alban)
 Shortlisted:
 Charlotte Bousquet : Nuits tatouées (série La Peau des rêves)
 Nicolas Cluzeau : Avant les ténèbres (série Chroniques de la mort blanche)
 Gabriel Katz : La Traque (série Le Puits des mémoires)
 Christophe Mauri : Le Premier Défi de Mathieu Hidalf

2011 
 Winner: Olivier Peru et Patrick McSpare : La Voix des rois (série Les Hauts-Conteurs)
 Shortlisted:
 Marie Caillet : Allégeance (série L'Héritage des Darcer)
 Vincent Jouvert : La Roue du vent
 Guilhem Méric : Le Secret des âmes sœurs (série Myrihandes)
 Carina Rozenfeld : Les Portes de Doregon (série Doregon)

2010 
 Winner: Pauline Alphen : Salicande (série Les Éveilleurs)
 Shortlisted:
 Samantha Bailly : La Langue du silence (série Au-delà de l'oraison)
 Pierre Bottero : Les  mes croisées
 Charlotte Bousquet : La Marque de la bête
 Jérôme Noirez : La Dernière Flèche

Foreign novel

2017 
 Winner: Guy Gavriel Kay : Le Fleuve Céleste
 Shortlisted:
 Angélica Gorodischer : Kalpa Impérial
 Ekaterina Sedia : L'Alchimie de la Pierre
 Emmi Itaranta : La Cité des méduses
 Aliette de Bodard : La Chute de la Maison aux Flèches d'Argent

2016 
 Winner: Hope Mirrless : Lud-en-Brume
 Shortlisted:
 Hélene Wecker : La Femme d'argile et l'Homme de feu
 Sofia Samatar : Un étranger en Olondre
 Marie Brennan : Une histoire naturelle des dragons
 Guy Gavriel Kay : Ysabel

2015 
 Winner: Guy Gavriel Kay : Les Chevaux célestes 
 Shortlisted:
 Graham Joyce : Comme un conte
 Brandon Sanderson :  La Voie des rois (série Les Archives de Roshar)
 Kazuo Ishiguro : Le Géant enfoui
 Poul Anderson : L'Épée brisée

2014 
 Winner: Catherynne M. Valente : Immortel
 Shortlisted:
 Miles Cameron : Le Chevalier rouge (série Renégat)
 Jo Walton : Morwenna
 Nnedi Okorafor : Qui a peur de la mort ?
 Dan O'Malley : The Rook, au service surnaturel de sa majesté

2013 
 Winner: Patrick Rothfuss : La Peur du sage (série Chronique du tueur de roi)
 Shortlisted:
 G. Willow Wilson : Alif l'Invisible
 Glen Duncan : Le Dernier Loup-garou
 Larry Correia : Malédiction (série Les Chroniques du Grimnoir)
 Joe Abercrombie : Servir Froid

2012 
 Winner: China Miéville : 
 Shortlisted:
 Ben Aaronovitch : Les Rivières de Londres (série Le Dernier Apprenti Sorcier)
 Joe Hill : Cornes
 Richard Kadrey : Butcher Bird
 Lucius Shepard : Le Dragon Griaule

2011 
 Winner: N. K. Jemisin : Les Cent Mille Royaumes (série Trilogie de l'Héritage)
 Shortlisted:
 Anne Bishop : Fille de sang (série Les Joyaux noirs)
 Jay Lake : Jade
 Martin Millar : Kalix, le loup-garou solitaire
 Chris Wooding : Frey (Série Frey)

2010 
 Winner: Brandon Sanderson : L'Empire ultime (série Fils-des-Brumes)
 Shortlisted:
 Jacqueline Carey : L'Avatar (série Kushiel)
 Stephen Deas : Le Palais adamantin (série Les Rois-dragons)
 Kate Elliott : Le Dragon du roi (série La Couronne d'étoiles)
 Ken Scholes : Lamentations (série Les Psaumes d'Issak)

Foreign novel for young people

2017 
 Winner: Maria Turtschaninoff : Maresi
 Shortlisted:
 Stéphanie Garber : Caraval
 Alison Goodman : Lady Helen : Le club des Mauvais Jours
 Irena Brignull : Les sorcières du clan du Nord
 Lian Hearn : L'Enfant du cerf (série Shikanoko)

2016 
 Winner: Sabaa Tahir : Une braise sous la cendre
 Shortlisted:
 Catherynne M. Valente : La Fille qui navigua autour de Féérie dans un bateau construit de ses propres mains
 S. E. Grove : Les Cartographes - La Sentence de verre
 Neil Gaiman : Par bonheur le lait
 Leigh Bardugo : Six of Crows

2015 
 Winner: Holly Black et Cassandra Clare : L'Épreuve de fer (série Le Magisterium)
 Shortlisted:
 P.D. Baccalario : La Boutique Vif-Argent
 Soman Chainani : L'École du bien et du mal
 Lisa Fiedler : L'Empire d'Atlantia (série La Guerre des mus)
 Amber Argyle : Witch Song (série Witch Song)

2014 
 Winner: Gail Carriger : Étiquette et Espionnage (série Le Pensionnat de Melle Geraldine)
 Shortlisted:
 Brandon Sanderson : Cœur d’acier
 Polly Shulman : La Malédiction Grimm
 Terry Pratchett : Le Monde merveilleux du caca (série Les Annales du Disque-Monde)
 Andrew Prentice et Jonathan Weil: Magie noire

2013 
 Winner: Leigh Bardugo : Les Orphelins du royaume (série Grisha)
 Shortlisted:
 Colin Meloy : Les Chroniques de Wildwood (série Les Chroniques de Wildwood)
 Licia Troisi : La Fille dragon
 Kathryn Littlewood : La Pâtisserie Bliss (série La Pâtisserie Bliss)
 Maggie Stiefvater : Sous le signe du scorpion

2012 
 Winner: Patrick Ness : Quelques minutes après minuit
 Shortlisted:
 Jasper Fforde : Moi, Jennifer Strange, dernière tueuse de dragon (série Jennifer Strange)
 Kai Meyer : La Soie et l'Épée (série Le Peuple des nuées)
 Eric Nylund : Le Pacte des immortels (série Le Pacte des immortels)
 Jonathan Stroud : L'Anneau de Salomon (série Bartimeus)

2011 
 Winner: Scott Westerfeld : Léviathan (série Leviathan)
 Shortlisted:
 Steve Augarde : Le Peuple des minuscules (série Touchstone)
 Kathleen Duey : L'Épreuve (série Le Prix de la magie)
 Cornelia Funke : Le Sortilège de pierre (série Reckless)
 Ursula K. Le Guin : Pouvoirs (série Chroniques des rivages de l'Ouest)

2010 
 Winner: China Miéville : Lombres
 Shortlisted:
 John Connoly : Le Livre des choses perdues
 Kami Garcia & Margaret Stohl : 16 Lunes (série Le Livre des Lunes)
 Alison Goodman : Eon et le Douzième Dragon
 Diana Wynne Jones : Les Sortilèges de la guiterne (série L'Odyssée Dalemark)

Multiple nominees

Multiple winners 
(minimum 2)
 China Miéville : 2
 2010 : Lombres (roman étranger pour la jeunesse)
 2012 : The City and the City (roman étranger)
 Estelle Faye : 2
 2013 : Porcelaine (roman français)
 2015 : Thya (série La Voie des oracles) (roman français pour la jeunesse)
 Guy Gavriel Kay : 2
 2015 : Les Chevaux célestes (roman étranger)
 2017 : Le Fleuve céleste (roman étranger)

Nominations 
(minimum 3)
 Charlotte Bousquet : 4
 French novel : 2010
 French novel for young people : 2010, 2012, 2017
 Lionel Davoust : 4
 French novel : 2010, 2015, 2016 et 2017
 Brandon Sanderson : 3
 Foreign novel : 2010, 2015
 Foreign novel for young people : 2014
 Estelle Faye : 3
 French novel : 2013, 2017
 French novel for young people : 2015
 Guy Gavriel Kay : 3
 Foreign novel : 2015, 2016, 2017

Notes and references

External links 
 Elbakin.net
 Articles of association of Elbakin.net

French literature websites
French fantasy
Fantasy awards
Internet properties established in 2000